The Lepontine Alps are a mountain range in the north-western part of the Alps. They are located in Switzerland (Valais, Ticino, Uri and Graubünden) and Italy (Piedmont and Lombardy).

The Simplon rail tunnel (from Brig to Domodossola) the Gotthard rail (from Erstfeld to Bodio) and Gotthard road tunnels (from Andermatt to Airolo) and the San Bernardino road tunnel are important transport arteries.

The eastern portion of the Lepontine Alps, from the St Gotthard Pass to the Splügen Pass, is sometimes named the Adula Alps, while the western part is historically referred to as the Ticino Alps.

Etymology 
The designation Lepontine Alps, derived from the Latin name of the Val Leventina, has long been somewhat vaguely applied to the Alpine ranges that enclose it, before being used for the whole range.

Geography

Following the line marking the division of the waters that flow into the Po from those that feed the Rhone or the Rhine, the main ridge of the Lepontine Alps describes a somewhat irregular curve, convex to the north, from the Simplon Pass to the Splugen Pass. With the single exception of the Monte Leone, overlooking the pass of the Simplon, the summits of this portion of the chain are much inferior in height to those of the neighbouring chains; but two peaks of the Adula group, culminating at the Rheinwaldhorn, exceed  in height.

The extensive region lying south of the main ridge is occupied by mountain ranges whose summits sometimes rival in height those of the dividing ridge, and which are cut through by deep valleys, three of which converge in the basins of Lake Maggiore and Lake Como, the deepest of all the lakes on the south side of the Alps. The most important of these valleys is the Val Leventina, or the Upper valley of the Ticino. This has been known from a remote antiquity because it leads to the Pass of St Gotthard, one of the easiest lines of communication between northern and southern Europe.

The Lepontine Alps are drained by the rivers Rhône in the west, Reuss in the north, Rhine (Vorderrhein and Hinterrhein) in the east and Ticino and Toce in the south.

List of peaks

The chief peaks of the Lepontine Alps are:

Glaciers

Main glaciers :

Gries Glacier
Paradies Glacier
Basòdino Glacier

List of passes

The chief passes of the Lepontine Alps are:

See also

Swiss Alps

References

 
Mountain ranges of the Alps
Mountain ranges of Lombardy
Mountain ranges of Piedmont
Mountain ranges of Graubünden
Landforms of Valais
Mountain ranges of Switzerland
Mountain ranges of Italy
Landforms of Ticino
Graubünden–Ticino border
Ticino–Valais border
Ticino–Uri border
Landforms of the canton of Uri